Joel Hofer (born July 30, 2000) is a Canadian professional ice hockey goaltender currently playing for the  St. Louis Blues of the National Hockey League (NHL). He was drafted by the Blues in the fourth round, 107th overall, in the 2018 NHL Entry Draft. He made his NHL debut in 2021 with the Blues.

Playing career
Hofer played major junior hockey in the Western Hockey League (WHL) with the Swift Current Broncos and the Portland Winterhawks. Following his selection by the St. Louis Blues in the 2018 NHL Entry Draft he was signed to a three-year, entry-level contract on March 22, 2019.

During the  season, Hofer was recalled from AHL affiliate, the Springfield Thunderbirds]], and made his NHL debut on November 5, 2021 against the San Jose Sharks, where he tallied an assist in the 5–3 win. Upon making his debut at the age of 21 years, 97 days, he became the youngest goaltender to win his NHL debut with the Blues. In returning to the Thunderbirds, during the post-season, on May 12, 2022, in the Calder Cup playoffs, Hofer scored a goal against the Wilkes-Barre/Scranton Penguins.

On January 3, 2023, Hofer was signed by the Blues to a two-year, one-way contract extension worth $1.55 million.

Career statistics

Regular season and playoffs

International

Awards and honours

References

External links
 

2000 births
Living people
Portland Winterhawks players
San Antonio Rampage players
Ice hockey people from Winnipeg
Springfield Thunderbirds players
St. Louis Blues draft picks
St. Louis Blues players
Swift Current Broncos players
Utica Comets players